John Irvin Delafose (April 16, 1939 – September 18, 1994) was an American French-speaking Creole Zydeco accordionist from Louisiana.

Early life
Delafose was born in the unincorporated village of Duralde, Evangeline Parish, Louisiana, near Mamou. His parents were sharecroppers. As a child, Delafose fashioned fiddles and guitars out of old boards and cigar boxes fitted with window-screen wire. The fiddle was his first instrument. He eventually took up the harmonica, and at the age of 18 learned the button accordion. However, he turned to farming and did not pursue music as a career until the early 1970s.

Career
He began as an accordionist and harmonicist with a variety of local Zydeco bands. In the mid-1970s, he formed the band The Eunice Playboys, with which he played until his death. Over its history, band members included three of his sons, as well as nephews and grandsons. The band continued under the direction of his son Geno Delafose.

Delafose gained wider public recognition with albums such as Joe Pete Got Two Women (Arhoolie, 1990) and Blues Stay Away from Me (Rounder, 1993).

He was seen in performance footage and his music was featured on the soundtrack of the 1992 John Sayles film Passion Fish. He was also a featured artist in the 1989 documentary film J'ai été au bal (I Went to the Dance).

Style
Delafose had a dynamic style and strong rural roots, with a strong staccato rhythm on the accordion, which has influenced almost all current Zydeco musicians. Unlike some of the younger performers at the time, Delafose sang in both English and French, and his repertoire featured two-steps and waltzes in addition to the highly percussive Afro-Caribbean rhythms of Zydeco. He occasionally played fiddle with the band, which was rare in Zydeco music. He and his band packed audiences into dance halls in southwest Louisiana, east Texas and New Orleans for more than 20 years.

Delafose's hit version of the Canray Fontenot song "Joe Pitre a Deux Femmes" brought the single-row accordion back into favor among Zydeco musicians.

Death
Delafose had a heart attack in 1993, while on the road headed toward a festival in Rhode Island. He later recovered, but experienced bouts of fatigue afterwards.
 
Delafose died after a short illness in the early morning hours of September 18, 1994 at the Opelousas General Hospital. He was buried in the cemetery of St. Mathilda Catholic Church in Eunice, Louisiana.

Discography

Studio and live albums

Singles

Various artist compilation albums

References

External links
 
 

1939 births
1994 deaths
20th-century American male musicians
20th-century accordionists
20th-century African-American musicians
People from Evangeline Parish, Louisiana
American accordionists
Blues musicians from Louisiana
Zydeco accordionists
Arhoolie Records artists
Rounder Records artists
Maison de Soul Records artists
African-American Catholics